Jonathan Gregory Brandis (April 13, 1976 – November 12, 2003) was an American actor. Beginning his career as a child model, Brandis moved on to acting in commercials and subsequently won television and film roles. Brandis made his acting debut in 1982 as Kevin Buchanan on the soap opera One Life to Live. In 1990, he portrayed Bill Denbrough in the television miniseries It. Also in 1990, he starred as Bastian Bux in The NeverEnding Story II: The Next Chapter. In 1993, at the age of 17, he was cast in the role of teen prodigy Lucas Wolenczak on the NBC series seaQuest DSV. The character was popular among teenage viewers, and Brandis regularly appeared in teen magazines. Brandis died by suicide in 2003 following a period of heavy drinking and career setbacks.

Early life
Jonathan Brandis was born in Danbury, Connecticut, the only child of Mary, a teacher and personal manager, and Gregory Brandis, a food distributor and firefighter. At the age of two, he began his career as a child model for Buster Brown shoes. At the age of four, Brandis began acting in television commercials. He attended San Fernando Valley Professional School, graduating in 1993.

Career
At age six, Brandis won the role of Kevin Buchanan on the soap opera One Life to Live. He moved to Los Angeles with his family at age nine and made guest appearances on shows such as Blossom; L.A. Law; Who's the Boss?; Murder, She Wrote; The Wonder Years; Full House; Webster and Kate & Allie.

At age 13, Brandis was cast in his first starring role as Bastian Bux in The NeverEnding Story II: The Next Chapter. He played the young "Stuttering Bill" Denbrough in the 1990 television miniseries Stephen King's It, based on the epic horror novel of the same name. Brandis' performance in the miniseries was lauded by critics and audiences. Brandis was cast as the lead in two movies made close together, first as Barry Gabrewski in Sidekicks and then starring as Matthew/Martha in Ladybugs.

Around age 17, Brandis landed one of his best-known roles, as scientific prodigy Lucas Wolenczak in Steven Spielberg's futuristic science fiction series seaQuest DSV. The role propelled him into teen idol status. At the height of his popularity, Brandis received approximately 4,000 fan letters a week and had to be escorted onto the set of seaQuest DSV by three studio security guards because of the many female fans present. He voiced Mozenrath, an evil young sorcerer and necromancer, in Disney's animated series Aladdin.

After seaQuest DSV was canceled in 1996, Brandis appeared in the television film Her Last Chance. His next role was in the television film Born Free: A New Adventure, which was shot in South Africa. He continued his career in supporting roles in Outside Providence (1999) and Ride with the Devil (1999). In 2000, he costarred in Bad Girls from Valley High, which, because of distribution problems, was not released until 2005, after his death. Brandis had a small role in Hart's War (2002). In 2003, he was cast in 111 Gramercy Park, a pilot that was not picked up by the network. He made his final onscreen appearance in action drama Puerto Vallarta Squeeze. That film was also released posthumously.

Personal life
From 1995 to 1998, Brandis dated actress and singer Tatyana Ali. The then-couple appeared in an article in People magazine in July 1996.

Death
On November 11, 2003, Brandis was found hanged in the hallway of his Los Angeles apartment. He was transported to Cedars-Sinai Medical Center and died the following day of injuries sustained from the hanging. He was 27 years old. 

Brandis did not leave a suicide note. After his death, friends reported that he had been depressed about his waning career and was reportedly disappointed when his appearance in the 2002 war drama Hart's War, a role he hoped would revive his career, was significantly reduced in the film's final cut. Brandis began drinking heavily and said that he intended to kill himself.

Filmography

Film

Television

Awards and nominations

References

External links

 
 
 

1976 births
2003 deaths
2003 suicides
20th-century American male actors
21st-century American male actors
American male child actors
American male film actors
American male television actors
American male voice actors
Male actors from Connecticut
People from Danbury, Connecticut
Suicides by hanging in California